Lepisanthes tetraphylla is a tree of India and Sri Lanka and other South Asian countries.

References

tetraphylla
Flora of tropical Asia